This article presents the discography of the Belgian pop singer Axelle Red.

Albums

Studio albums

Live albums

Compilations

Box sets

DVDs

Singles

References

Discographies of Belgian artists
Pop music discographies